Agraphini is a weevil tribe in the subfamily Entiminae endemic to the east coast of the United States. There are only two genera known, each with one species.

Genera 
 Agraphus
 Paragraphus

References 

 Horn G.H. 1876: [Otiorhynchidae, pp. 13–112] In: LeConte J.L., Horn G.H.: The Rhynchophora of America North of Mexico. Proceedings of the American Philosophical Society held at Philadelphia for promoting useful knowledge, 15(No. 96): vii-xvi, 1–455.

External links 

Entiminae
Beetle tribes